Brandon Phelps (born August 16, 1970) is a Democratic  member of the Illinois House of Representatives, representing the 118th District from January 2003 to September 2017. The 118th district, located in Southern Illinois, includes all or parts of Anna, Belknap, Belle Prairie City, Brookport, Broughton, Buncombe, Burnside, Cairo, Carbondale, Carrier Mills, Cave-In-Rock, Cypress, Dahlgren, Dongola, East Cape Girardeau, Eddyville, Eldorado, Elizabethtown, Equality, Galatia, Golconda, Goreville, Harrisburg, Joppa, Junction, Karnak, Makanda, Marion, McClure, McLeansboro, Metropolis, Mound City, Mounds, New Grand Chain, New Haven, Old Shawneetown, Olive Branch, Olmsted, Omaha, Pulaski, Raleigh, Ridgway, Rosiclare, Shawneetown, Simpson, Stonefort, Tamms, Thebes, Ullin, and Vienna. He resigned on September 1, 2017.

Phelps is the nephew of former U.S. Representative David D. Phelps.

Phelps sponsored the Illinois Transportation Taxes and Fees Lockbox Amendment in the Illinois House of Representatives.

References

External links
Biography, bills and committees at the 98th Illinois General Assembly
By session: 98th, 97th, 96th, 95th, 94th, 93rd
State Representative Brandon Phelps constituency site
 

Democratic Party members of the Illinois House of Representatives
1954 births
Living people
People from Eldorado, Illinois
21st-century American politicians
People from Harrisburg, Illinois
2020 United States presidential electors